Bridge of Dee, Galloway is a settlement on the River Dee, Galloway. It lies on the A75 just west of Castle Douglas, and north-east of Kirkcudbright.

The former Kirkcudbright Railway, linking Kirkcudbright with  Castle Douglas, passed through the village. The station is now a house.

People from Bridge of Dee
William Allan Forsyth Hepburn FRSE OBE MC LLD (1891-1950) educationalist

Old Bridge of Dee

The old bridge was possibly a packhorse bridge, hence the carving.

Footnotes

Villages in Dumfries and Galloway